This list of Northwestern University buildings encompasses the two campuses of Northwestern University: Evanston, Illinois and Chicago, Illinois. The Evanston site has approximately 150 buildings on its  campus. Many of these buildings are located on the Northwestern University Lakefill.

Evanston campus

Libraries

Performing arts

Science & technology buildings

Academic buildings

Religious buildings

Athletic buildings

Administrative and other buildings

Residences

Other buildings
Listed alphabetically by address

1808 Chicago Avenue
1810-12 Chicago Avenue, Department of Anthropology, Department of Sociology
1815 Chicago Avenue
405 Church Street, College Preparation Program
515 Clark Street
555 Clark Street, Cook Family Writing Program, Mathematical Methods in the Social Sciences Program, Center for the Writing Arts, various student financial offices
619 Clark Street, various financial offices
625 Colfax Street
629 Colfax Street, Office of Global Safety and Security
617 Dartmouth Place, Center for Talent Development
627 Dartmouth Place, Searle Center for Advancing Learning and Teaching
630 Dartmouth Place, International Office
1201 Davis St, various alumni and development offices, University Police
619 Emerson Street, Holocaust Educational Foundation, Office of Undergraduate Studies and Advising
633 Emerson Street, Student Health Services
618 Garrett Place, Master of Science in Education (MSEd)
625 Haven Street
617 Haven Street, Naval ROTC
600 Haven Street, New Student and Family Programs (NSFP)
1801 Hinman Avenue, Undergraduate Admissions and Financial Aid, Veterans Office
1810 Hinman Avenue, Department of Anthropology
1812 Hinman Avenue 
1813 Hinman Avenue, Center for Civic Engagement, Center for Leadership, Chicago Field Studies Program (CFS)
1819 Hinman Avenue, Program of Asian American Studies
1835 Hinman Avenue, Dining hall
617 Library Place, Writing Place
618 Library Place, Center for Applied Psychological and Family Studies, The Family Institute
620 Library Place, Program of African Studies, Institute for the Study of Islamic Thought in Africa (ISITA)
626 Library Place
620 Lincoln Street, Legal Studies Program
630 Lincoln Street, Northwestern Career Advancement and SafeRide
640 Lincoln Street, Art Theory and Practice Department
1801 Maple Avenue, Media Management Center (MMC), NU in Qatar Support Office, Traffic Safety School
616 Noyes Street, Integrated Science Program (ISP)
617 Noyes Street, National High School Institute
625 Noyes
629 Noyes Street, Northwestern University Press
1840 Oak Ave, Osher Lifelong Learning Institute
1603 Orrington Ave, Office of Compliance, Audit and Advisory Service
2601 Orrington Ave, Wieboldt House
2020 Ridge Avenue, various administrative offices
1902 Sheridan Rd, Equality Development and Globalization Studies (EDGS), Roberta Buffett Institute for Global Studies, Center for International and Comparative Studies, Center for Technology Innovation Management
1908 Sheridan Rd, Office of Undergraduate Studies and Advising
1914 Sheridan Rd, African American Student Affairs
1918 Sheridan Rd, Dean's Office for the Weinberg College of Arts and Sciences
1922 Sheridan Rd, Office of Undergraduate Studies and Advising
1936 Sheridan Rd, Multicultural Center, Multicultural Student Affairs, University Academic Advisory Center, Asian/Asian American Student Affairs
1940 Sheridan Rd, Office of Fellowships & the University Academic Advising Center (UAAC)
2000 Sheridan Rd
2006 Sheridan Rd, Statistics Department
2010 Sheridan Rd, Programs for Asian Studies, International Studies, International and Area Studies, and Latin American and Caribbean Studies, and the Harvey Kapnick Center for Business Institutions 
2016 Sheridan Rd, Department of Linguistics
2040 Sheridan Rd, Institute for Policy Research
2046 Sheridan Rd
2122 Sheridan Rd, various residential services
1800 Sherman Avenue, purchased 2004. Innovation and New Ventures Office (INVO), Art History Department, Gender and Sexuality Studies, Department of German, Global Health Studies Program, Middle East and North African Studies (MENA), Slavic Languages and Literatures
720 University Place, Human Resources, Payroll

Chicago campus

Northwestern University School of Law

Kellogg School of Management

Patient care and research

Feinberg School of Medicine

Northwestern Memorial Hospital

Rehabilitation Institute of Chicago (RIC)

Ann & Robert H. Lurie Children’s Hospital of Chicago

See also
Northwestern University

History of Northwestern University

References

Northwestern University
College basketball venues in the United States
College football venues

Defunct college basketball venues in the United States
Northwestern University buildings
Gothic Revival architecture in Illinois
Northwestern University
Buildings and structures in Evanston, Illinois
Northwestern Illinois